KREF may refer to:

 KREF (AM), a radio station (1400 AM) licensed to serve Norman, Oklahoma, United States
 KREF-FM, a radio station (94.7 FM) licensed to serve Oklahoma City, Oklahoma